Tracy Yerkes Thomas (1899–1983) was an American mathematician.

Biography
Thomas received his A.B. in 1921 from Rice University and then his A.M. in 1922 and Ph.D. in 1923 from Princeton University. For the academic year 1923–1924 he was a National Research Fellow in Physics at the University of Chicago and in the academic year 1924–1925 a postdoc in Zürich. For the academic year 1925–1926 he was a National Research Fellow in Mathematics at Harvard University and then Princeton University, where he was on the mathematics faculty from 1926 to 1938. From 1938 to 1944 he was a professor at the University of California, Los Angeles. From 1944 to 1969 he was a professor at Indiana University. In 1952, he was one of the founders of the Journal of Rational Mechanics and Analysis, which is now known as the Indiana University Mathematics Journal.

Thomas was in 1941 elected a member of the National Academy of Sciences.

Upon his death, he was survived by his wife, Virginia Rowland Thomas, and son, Tracy Alexander Thomas.

Selected publications

Articles
The Einstein Equations of the Gravitational Field for an Arbitrary Distribution of Matter. Proceedings of the National Academy of Sciences 9, no. 8 (1923): 275–278.
with Oswald Veblen: The geometry of paths. Trans. Amer. Math. Soc. 25 (1923) 551–608. 
with Oswald Veblen: Extensions of relative tensors. Trans. Amer. Math. Soc. 26 (1924) 373–377. 
Note on the projective geometry of paths. Bull. Amer. Math. Soc. 31 (1925) 318–322. 
On the projective and equi-projective geometries of paths. Proceedings of the National Academy of Sciences 11, no. 4 (1925): 199–203.
On conformal geometry. Proceedings of the National Academy of Sciences 12, no. 5 (1926): 352–359.
with Jack Levine: On a class of existence theorems in differential geometry. Bull. Amer. Math. Soc. 40 (1934) 721–728. 
Algebraic characterizations in complex differential geometry. Trans. Amer. Math. Soc. 38 (1935) 501–514. 
On the metric representations of affinely connected spaces. Bull. Amer. Math. Soc. 42 (1936) 77–78. 
On the singular point locus in the theory of fields of parallel vectors. Bull. Amer. Math. Soc. 45 (1939) 436–441. 
Imbedding theorems in differential geometry. Bull. Amer. Math. Soc. 45 (1939) Part 1:841–850. 
On the uniform convergence of the solutions of the Navier-Stokes equations. Proceedings of the National Academy of Sciences 29, no. 8 (1943): 243–246.
Algebraic determination of the second fundamental form of a surface by its mean curvature. Bull. Amer. Math. Soc. 51 (1945) Part 1:390–399. 
The fundamental theorem on quadratic first integrals. Proceedings of the National Academy of Sciences 32, no. 1 (1946): 10–15.
Combined elastic and Prandtl-Reuss stress-strain relations. Proceedings of the National Academy of Sciences 41, no. 10 (1955): 720–726.
On the stress-strain relations for cubic crystals. Proceedings of the National Academy of Sciences 55, no. 2 (1966): 235–239.

Books

References

20th-century American mathematicians
Rice University alumni
Princeton University alumni
1899 births
1983 deaths
Princeton University faculty
University of California, Los Angeles faculty
Indiana University faculty
Members of the United States National Academy of Sciences